The Chitonophilidae are a family of parasitic copepods, with these genera:
Chitonophilus Avdeev & Sirenko, 1991
Cocculinika Jones & Marshall, 1986
Cookoides Avdeev & Sirenko, 1994
Ischnochitonika Franz & Bullock, 1990
Lepetellicola Huys, Lopez-Gonzalez, Roldan & Luque, 2002
Leptochitonicola Avdeev & Sirenko, 1991
Leptochitonoides Avdeev & Sirenko, 2005
Nucellicola Lamb, Boxshall, Mill & Grahame, 1996
Tesonesma Avdeev & Sirenko, 1994

References

Cyclopoida
Crustacean families